The 1970 Summer Universiade, also known as the VI Summer Universiade, took place in Turin, Italy.

After the city of Lisbon, Portugal failed to host the 1969 Summer Universiade, the games were assigned to Turin to be held next year.

Sports at the 1970 Summer Universiade
 Athletics
 Basketball
 Diving
 Fencing
 Gymnastics
 Swimming
 Tennis
 Volleyball
 Water polo

Medal table

References

 
1970
U
U
U
Multi-sport events in Italy
Sports competitions in Turin
August 1970 sports events in Europe
September 1970 sports events in Europe
1970s in Turin